Reaper, in comics, may refer to:
 Reaper (Marvel Comics):
 Reaper (Pantu Hurageb), a Marvel Comics character who has appeared in X-Force
 Reaper (Gunther Strauss), a Marvel Comics fictional Nazi spy
 Reaper (DC Comics), a number of DC Comics characters

See also 
 Grim Reaper (comics)
 Reaper (disambiguation)

References